Schirin Zorriassateiny (April 3, 1964 in Lørenskog, Akershus) is a Norwegian rhythmic gymnast.

Zorriassateiny competed for Norway in the rhythmic gymnastics individual all-around competition at the 1984 Summer Olympics in Los Angeles. There she was 19th in the preliminary (qualification) round and advanced to the final of 20 competitors. In the end she finished in the 20th place overall.

References

External links 
 
 

1964 births
Living people
People from Lørenskog
Norwegian rhythmic gymnasts
Gymnasts at the 1984 Summer Olympics
Olympic gymnasts of Norway
Sportspeople from Viken (county)